The 2001 Deutsche Tourenwagen Masters was the fifteenth season of premier German touring car championship and also second season under the moniker of Deutsche Tourenwagen Masters since the series' resumption in 2000. There were ten race weekends with one race at each event.

Teams and drivers
The following manufacturers, teams and drivers competed in the 2001 Deutsche Tourenwagen Masters. All teams competed with tyres supplied by Dunlop.

Race calendar and winners

Two international rounds were added: A1-Ring in Austria and Zandvoort in the Netherlands. Each weekend comprised a 30 km qualifying race and a 100 km main race.

Drivers' Championship
Scoring system
Each round featured a "Qualifying Race", and the "Main Race".

In the "Qualifying Race", the top 3 finishers were awarded points as follows;

In the "Main Race", the top 6 finishers were awarded points as follows;

† — Driver retired, but was classified as they completed 90% of the winner's race distance.

Teams' championship

External links
 Official DTM website

Deutsche Tourenwagen Masters seasons
Deutsche Tourenwagen Masters